James Tetteh Nanor (born 12 August 1976) is a Ghanaian former professional footballer who played as a goalkeeper and currently serves as goalkeepers coach.

Club career 
He played in Ghana for Afienya United and Hearts of Oak. He won the Ghana Premier League six times and the Ghanaian FA Cup twice with Hearts of Oak.

International career 
He was also capped for Ghana, and was a squad member in the 2002 Africa Cup of Nations. In December 1999, Nanor was suspended by CAF for one year after spitting on a referee during a 1999 CAF Champions League group stage match.

Coaching career 
Nanor became a goalkeepers coach when he retired from football. In August 2014, he was appointed as the goalkeepers coach for Tema-based side International Allies.

Honours

Club 
Hearts of Oak

 Ghana Premier League: 1997–98, 1999, 2000, 2001, 2002, 2004
 Ghanaian FA Cup: 1999, 2000
Ghana Super Cup: 1997, 1998

References

External links

Living people
1976 births
Association football goalkeepers
Ghanaian footballers
Accra Hearts of Oak S.C. players
Ghana international footballers
2002 African Cup of Nations players